Unsolved Mysteries is an American mystery documentary television show that began with a series of television specials, airing on NBC from 1987 to 1988. The program was picked up in 1988 and aired a total of nine seasons during its run on the network. The series was then acquired by CBS in 1997, where it continued for a short run of 2 seasons. In 2001, Lifetime acquired the series where it finished its original run in 2002, followed shortly by the death of regular host Robert Stack. The series ran in syndication for a number of years until it was resurrected by Spike TV in 2008. The new series featured host Dennis Farina profiling cases from the previous series, with new updates and reenactments, before ending its run in 2010. In 2020, the series returned with all-new episodes and a new format on Netflix.

Series overview

Episodes

Specials (1987–88)

Season 1 (1988–89)

Season 2 (1989–90)

Season 3 (1990–91)

Season 4 (1991–92)

Season 5 (1992–93)

Season 6 (1993–94)

Season 7 (1994–95)

Season 8 (1995–96)

Season 9 (1996–97)

Season 10 (1997–98)

Season 11 (1999)

Season 12 (2001–02)

Season 13 (2002)

Season 14 (2008–10)

Season 15 (2020)

Season 16 (2022)

References

External links
 
 
 

Lists of American non-fiction television series episodes
Lists of mystery television series episodes
UFO-related television